Hitz939 is a radio station operated by ARN in Bundaberg, Australia.

Using the callsign 4RUM, Hitz939 is notable for being the first commercial FM licence in the Bundaberg region. Commencing broadcast on 29 March 1993 as a rock format station Hitz FM 93.9, the first song broadcast was "We Built This City" by Starship.

Since then, the station has moved towards a Hot Adult Contemporary format, playing a mix of 1980s, 1990s, 2000s and new music appealing to a 25-40 audience.

In November 2021, Hitz939, along with other stations owned by Grant Broadcasters, were acquired by the Australian Radio Network. This deal allows Grant's stations, including Hitz939, to access ARN's iHeartRadio platform in regional areas. The deal was finalized on January 4, 2022. It is expected Hitz939 will integrate with ARN's KIIS Network, but will retain its current name according to the press release from ARN.

Hitz939 broadcasts exclusively local content through the day, plus Fitzy and Wippa and Australia's number 1 drive show, Kate, Tim & Marty, and The Random 30 and OzMade in the evenings. The station studios are located at 38 Crofton St, Bundaberg.

Hitz 939 On-Air Line-up
6am - 9am: Breakfast With Matty & Trace
9am - 12pm: Mornings with Billy 
12pm - 5pm: Bundy’s Big Arvo with Brendo 
5pn - 7pm:  Will & Woody 
7pm - 8pm:  Kyle And Jackie O 
8pm - 10pm:  The Random 30 
10pm - 12am: OzMade

Key Staff
General Manager: Corey Pitt
Program Director: Mark Hamel
Production: Brendan Egan
Promotions/Breakfast Announcer: Tracey Sergiacomi

Other current staff:
Breakfast Announcer: Matthew Ambrose

Previous Staff
 Mike Lundberg
 Trevor Taege
 Louise Morrow
 Julianne Pemble-smith
 Keiron Atkinson
 Tania Feaver
 Jason Roe
 Steve Baker
 Craig Huth
 Mike Cameron
Pete Brandtman
 Scott Rose (news)
 Glenn Mintern
 Peter Hurren

Ratings
In survey results released on July 12, 2016, Hitz939 was found to be Bundaberg's most listened to station, with 23.3% of the audience. Hitz939 also led in the Breakfast and Workday timeslots and on weekends.

Hitz939 also had the highest 10+ cumulative audience, with 28,300 listeners.

External links
 Hitz939 Official Website

References

Radio stations in Queensland
Hot adult contemporary radio stations in Australia
Australian Radio Network